Gurara Waterfalls is located in Gurara, a local government area of Niger State, North Central Nigeria. The waterfalls is approximately 30 metres in height and it lies on the Gurara River along the Suleja-Minna Road.

Myth and folklore
According to oral history, Gurara Waterfalls was discovered by a Gwari hunter called Buba in 1745 before some Europeans discovered it in 1925 after they found it as a recreation centre. Prior to the discovery of the waterfalls by the Europeans, Gurara Waterfalls was worshipped by people living in communities around it. Oral history also has it that Gurara Waterfalls and Gurara River were named after two deities called Gura and Rara.

Tourism
Despite its chequered history, Gurara Waterfalls is one of the major tourist sites in Nigeria. There have been plans in recent times to turn it into a resort with a recreation centre and a seven-star hotel around it.

See also
 List of waterfalls

References

External link

Waterfalls of Nigeria
Tourist attractions in Niger State